Jacob wrestling with the angel is described in Genesis (32:22–32; also referenced in Hosea 12:3–5). The "angel" in question is referred to as "man" and "God" in Genesis, while Hosea references an "angel". The account includes the renaming of Jacob as Israel (etymologized as "contends-with-God").
 
In the Genesis narrative, Jacob spent the night alone on a riverside during his journey back to Canaan. He encounters a "man" who proceeds to wrestle with him until daybreak.  In the end, Jacob is given the name "Israel" and blessed, while the "man" refuses to give his own name. Jacob then names the place where they wrestled Penuel ( "face of God" or "facing God").

Biblical text
The Masoretic text reads as follows:

The account contains several plays on the meaning of Hebrew names—Peniel (or Penuel), Israel—as well as similarity to the root of Jacob's name (which sounds like the Hebrew for "heel") and its compound. The limping of Jacob (Yaʿaqob ), may mirror the name of the river, Jabbok (Yabbok יַבֹּק , sounds like "crooked" river), and Nahmanides (Deut. 2:10 of Jeshurun) gives the etymology "one who walks crookedly" for the name Jacob.
 
The Hebrew text states that it is a "man" (אִישׁ, LXX ἄνθρωπος, Vulgate vir) with whom Jacob wrestles, but later this "man" is identified with God (Elohim) by Jacob.
Hosea 12:4 furthermore references an "angel" (malak). Following this,  the Targum of Onkelos offers "because I have seen the Angel of the Lord face to face", and the Targum of Palestine gives "because I have seen the Angels of the Lord face to face".

Interpretations
The identity of Jacob's wrestling opponent is a matter of debate, named variously as a dream figure, a prophetic vision, an angel (such as Michael and Samael), a protective river spirit, Jesus, or God.

Jewish interpretations
In Hosea 12:4, Jacob's opponent is described as malakh "angel":  "Yes, he had power over the angel, and prevailed: he wept, and made supplication to him: he found him in Bethel, and there he spoke with us;". The relative age of the text of Genesis and of Hosea is unclear, as both are part of the Hebrew Bible as redacted in the Second Temple Period, and it has been suggested that malakh may be a late emendation of the text, and would as such represent an early Jewish interpretation of the episode.

Maimonides believed that the incident was "a vision of prophecy", while Rashi believed Jacob wrestled with the guardian angel of Esau (identified as Samael), his elder twin brother. 
Zvi Kolitz (1993) referred to Jacob "wrestling with God".

As a result of the hip injury Jacob suffered while wrestling, Jews are prohibited from eating the meat tendon attached to the hip socket (sciatic tendon), as mentioned in the account at Genesis 32:32.

Christian interpretations
The interpretation that "Jacob wrestled with God" (glossed in the name Isra-'el) is common in Protestant theology, endorsed by both
Martin Luther and John Calvin  (although Calvin believed the event was "only a vision"), 
as well as later writers such as Joseph Barker (1854)  or 
Peter L. Berger  (2014).
Other commentaries treat the expression of Jacob's having seen "God face to face" as referencing the Angel of the Lord as the "Face of God".

The proximity of the terms "man" and "God" in the text in some Christian commentaries has also been taken as suggestive of a Christophany. J. Douglas MacMillan (1991) suggests that the angel with whom Jacob wrestles is a "pre-incarnation appearance of Christ in the form of a man."

According to one Christian commentary of the Bible incident described, "Jacob said, 'I saw God face to face'. Jacob's remark does not necessarily mean that the 'man' with whom he wrestled is God. Rather, as with other, similar statements, when one saw the 'angel of the Lord,' it was appropriate to claim to have seen the face of God."

Islamic interpretation
This story is not mentioned in the Quran, but is discussed in Muslim commentaries.  The commentaries employ the story in explaining other events in the Hebrew Bible that are discussed in the Quran that have parallels, like Moses being attacked by an angel, and to explain Jewish eating customs. Like some Jewish commentators, Islamic commentators described the event as punishment for Jacob failing to give tithes to God but making an offering like a tithe to Esau.

Other views
In an analysis of Marxist philosopher Ernst Bloch's 1968 book Atheism in Christianity, Roland Boer says that Bloch sees the incident as falling into the category of "myth, or at least legend". Boer calls this an example of "a bloodthirsty, vengeful God ... outdone by cunning human beings keen to avoid his fury".

The wrestling incident on the bank of a stream has been compared to the Greek mythology stories of Achilles' duel with the river god Scamander and with Menelaus wrestling with the sea-god Proteus. It is also claimed the wrestling incident, along with other Old Testament stories of the Jewish Patriarchs, is based on Akhenaten-linked Egyptian mythology, where Jacob is Osiris/Wizzer, Esau is Set, and the wrestling match is the struggle between them.

Rosemary Ellen Guiley gives this summary:
"This dramatic scene has spurred much commentary from Judaic, Catholic, and Protestant theologians, biblical scholars, and literary critics. Does Jacob wrestle with God or with an angel? ... There is no definitive answer, but the story has been rationalized, romanticized, treated as myth, and treated symbolically."

In arts

Visual arts
One of the oldest visual depictions is in the illustrated manuscript the Vienna Genesis. Many artists have depicted the scene, considering it as a paradigm of artistic creation. In sculpture Jacob Wrestling with the Angel is the subject of a 1940 sculpture by Sir Jacob Epstein on display at the Tate Britain. Paintings include:

In music
The Latin text of Genesis 32:30 'Vidi dominum facie ad faciem; et salva facta est anima mea' (I have seen the Lord face to face) was set for the third nocturn at Matins on the second Sunday of Lent and was a popular medieval telling of the story of Jacob's encounter with the angel. It is set as the tenor (upper voice) text of Machaut's multi-text-layered Motet Vidi dominum (M 15; I have seen the Lord) simultaneously with two secular French texts: "Faux semblant m'a decü" and "Amours qui ha le pouvoir." Machaut musically contrasts God's blessing in the Latin text with the disappointments of secular love in the French texts. Charles Wesley's hymn "Come, O Thou Traveller Unknown", often known as "Wrestling Jacob", is based on the passage which describes Jacob wrestling with an angel. It is traditionally sung to the tune of St Petersburg. 
U2's Bullet the Blue Sky, the 4th track on their 1987 album The Joshua Tree includes the lyric "Jacob wrestled the angel and the angel was overcome." 
The lyrics of Isaac, a song featured on Madonna's Confessions on a Dance Floor album, contains many allusions to the book of Genesis and references Jacob's encounter with the angel in the line "wrestle with your darkness, angels call your name". Noah Reid released his song "Jacob's Dream" as the second single of his 2020 second album. The song uses the metaphor of wrestling with angels to explore that "blessings are hard to come by and they cost you something," as Reid told Indie88.  Mark Alburger's Israel in Trouble, Op. 57 (1997) includes the story in movement VIII. On his way.

In literature and theatre
The motif of "wrestling with the angels" occurs in several novels including Hermann Hesse's Demian (1919), Dodie Smith's I Capture the Castle (1948), Margaret Laurence's The Stone Angel (1964). In T.H. White's The Once and Future King, the Wart is described as knowing that the work of training a hawk "had been like Jacob's struggle with the angel".  In poetry the theme appears in Rainer Maria Rilke's "The Man Watching" (c.1920), Henry Wadsworth Longfellow's "Evangeline," Herman Melville's poem "Art," and Emily Dickinson's poem "A little East of Jordan" (Fr145B, 1860).  In theatre, wrestling with the angel is mentioned in Tony Kushner's play Angels in America (1990); the version depicted in its miniseries adaptation is the 1865 version by Alexander Louis Leloir. Gustave Dore's image is reenacted in Jean-Luc Godard's Passion by a film extra dressed as an angel and Jerzy Radziwiłowicz. Also Maud Hart Lovelace's Betsy's Wedding (1955), Stephen King's novel 11/22/63 (2011), Sheila Heti's novel Motherhood (2018) and David Fennario's play Balconville (1979). A short story in Daniel Mallory Ortberg's collection The Merry Spinster (2018) explores a version of the narrative as told from the perspective of the angel.

See also
 Angel of the Lord
 Jacob's ladder
 Theophany
 List of angels in theology

References

Further reading 
   Also in:  (p. 22).

External links

 Links to images of Jacob Wrestling with the Angel
 Jacob's Wrestling Match: Was It an Angel or Esau?
 Wrestling with Angels chabad.org

Angelic apparitions in the Bible
Christian iconography
Jacob
Theophanies in the Hebrew Bible